Balmikism is a Hindu sect that reveres the sage Balmiki (also known as Bala Shah or Lal Beg) as their ancestor as a patron saint. Followers believe that Balmiki was an avatar of God, and they consider his works, the Ramayana and the Yoga Vasistha, as their holy scripture. Balmiki is often depicted as wearing red clothing and is thus known as Lal Bhekh (or Lal Beg).

Balmiki mandirs (temples) are open to all and the most important festival celebrated by Balmiki Hindus is Balmiki Jayanti, which marks the birthday of Balmiki.

Many worshippers at Balmiki Hindu temples are Dalits, especially those belonging to the Chuhra community, though adherents from other castes pray there too and patrons of Balmiki temples come from diverse castes.

See also
Valmiki caste
Ardaas
Pargat Diwas

References

Hindu denominations